Ernest H. Wiegand (July 10, 1886 – April 1973) was a professor of horticulture at Oregon State University who, in 1925 during Prohibition, developed a brine method that led to the modern maraschino cherry.  He won the Nicholas Appert Award in 1960.  The food sciences building on the university's Corvallis, Oregon campus, Wiegand Hall, is named in his honour.

References 
 Chronological history of Oregon State University - 1920 to 1929
  The Fruit That Made Oregon Famous!

1886 births
1973 deaths
American food scientists
Oregon State University faculty